Christian Rauch Rose (born June 14, 1995) is an American professional stock car racing driver who competes full-time in the ARCA Menards Series and part-time in the ARCA Menards Series East and West, driving the No. 32 Ford Fusion for AM Racing. He also competes part-time in the NASCAR Craftsman Truck Series, driving a Ford F-150 for AM Racing.

Racing career
Rose made his ARCA Menards Series West debut in 2021. He made his debut at the Las Vegas Motor Speedway Bullring, finishing 10th. He followed that up finishing 7th at the All-American Speedway.

In 2022, Rose entered in Phoenix in the combination race with the West Series and later on attempted the second race at Irwindale.

Rose made his ARCA Menards Series East debut in 2022 at New Smyrna Speedway. He would drive in the rest of the East Series races that year except for Iowa.

On January 10, 2023, AM Racing announced that Rose would drive full-time for the team in the main ARCA Series in 2023 in their No. 32 car as well as run part-time in the Truck Series for the team. It will be his debut in that series.

Personal life
Prior to beginning his racing career, Rose played college baseball at the University of Maryland-Eastern Shore.

Motorsports career results

NASCAR
(key) (Bold – Pole position awarded by qualifying time. Italics – Pole position earned by points standings or practice time. * – Most laps led.)

Craftsman Truck Series

ARCA Menards Series
(key) (Bold – Pole position awarded by qualifying time. Italics – Pole position earned by points standings or practice time. * – Most laps led.)

ARCA Menards Series East

ARCA Menards Series West

 Season still in progress

References

External links
 
 

1995 births
Living people
ARCA Menards Series drivers
NASCAR drivers
Racing drivers from West Virginia
Sportspeople from Martinsburg, West Virginia